Deer Creek is a stream in Polk County in the Ozarks of southwest Missouri. It is a tributary of the Pomme de Terre River.

The stream arises to the southwest of the community of Schofield and flows southwest and then northwest passing under Missouri Route H and Missouri Route YY past Van before entering the Pomme de Terre south of Burns.

Deer Creek was so named on account of deer in the area.

See also
List of rivers of Missouri

References

Rivers of Polk County, Missouri
Rivers of Missouri